De Hoop (English: 'The Hope') is a smock mill in Sleen, Drenthe, the Netherlands, which has been restored to working order. The mill was built in 1914 and is listed as a Rijksmonument, number 33787.

History
A mill was built here in 1850. It was a smock mill without a stage and stood until it was burnt down in 1914. To replace it, the mill known as De Gunst, also known as the Molen van Nefkens, was moved from Amersfoort, Utrecht by millwright L Reinds of Beilen. The mill was built for miller H Berends. The mill was restored between 1953 and 1956 by millwright Huberts of Coevorden. On 24 July 1956 the mill was put back to work. In 1976, millwright J D Medendorp of Zuidlaren restored the mill again. In 2010 the local authority Gemeente Coevorden became owner of the mill. Society "Sleener Molen Stichting ‘De Hoop’" was founded in 2012 to work the mill.

Description

De Hoop is what the Dutch describe as an achtkante stellingmolen. It is a three-storey smock mill with a stage on a three-storey brick base. The smock and cap are thatched. The mill is winded by a tailpole and winch. The windshaft also carries the brake wheel, which has 62 cogs. This drives the wallower (30 cogs) at the top of the upright shaft. At the bottom of the upright shaft, the great spur wheel, which has 113 cogs, drives the -diameter French Burr stones via a lantern pinion stone nut with 34 staves.

Millers
H Berends (1914– )

Public access
De Hoop is open to the public whenever a blue flag is flying. The mill is also open on the Drentse Molendag, the last Saturday in August.

References

External links
De Hoop website

Windmills in Drenthe
Smock mills in the Netherlands
Windmills completed in 1914
Grinding mills in the Netherlands
Rijksmonuments in Drenthe
Octagonal buildings in the Netherlands
De Hoop, Sleen